Dumbreck railway station is a railway station in Dumbreck, a district of Glasgow, Scotland. It is accessed from the Nithsdale Road at the bridge over the railway. Dumbreck railway station is also the closest station for the Bellahouston Park.

History
It was opened on 28 July 1990 at the same time as the reopening by British Rail of the Paisley Canal Line, which had closed to passengers in 1983. Dumbreck is situated close to the site of one of the original stations on the line, Bellahouston, which closed in 1954.

Services 

There is an hourly service on Sundays.

References

Sources

External links

Railway stations in Glasgow
Railway stations opened by British Rail
Railway stations in Great Britain opened in 1990
SPT railway stations
Railway stations served by ScotRail
Pollokshields